Estadio Charrúa is a stadium in the Carrasco neighborhood of Montevideo, Uruguay, used mostly for football and rugby union matches. Property of the Montevideo Department, it is currently leased to the Uruguayan Rugby Union and Uruguayan Football Association after an agreement signed in 2012. The stadium holds 14,000 people. 

Estadio Charrúa has been a frecquent venue of several teams such as the Uruguay national rugby union team, Uruguay women's national football team, Peñarol Rugby and Montevideo City Torque.

History 
Originally planned and built as a football venue in 1984, in 2006 it was re-built thanks to a FIFA project called GOAL.

Local club Peñarol attempted to acquire the stadium in 1993, but those negotiations did not prosper. The club made a new attempt in 2001 with a project that included its expansion to 30,000 spectators with an investment of US$8 million. With a period of concession of 30 years, refurbishments also included new press boxes, dressing rooms, and parking lot. Nevertheless the Montevideo Neighborhood Council rejected the project due to "the negative impact for the area (...) the deterioration of the quality of life of the residents and the devaluation of their patrimony".

In December 2012 the Municipality of Montevideo signed a contract of concession with both bodies, Uruguayan Rugby Union (URU) and Uruguayan Football Association (AUF) for ten years. The URU used the stadium for its headquarters, its high performance training center, and as the regular home of its national teams, most notably the senior men's team.

Since 2013 the stadium has hosted Uruguay national rugby union team matches, and has also hosted Charrúas (American football national team of Uruguay) matches, and even concerts. The name Charrúa refers to Indigenous peoples in Uruguay.

In football, the stadium is the home venue for Montevideo City Torque matches since 2020, when the team moved from Estadio Centenario.

Events

Football 
The stadium was one of three venues for the 2018 FIFA U-17 Women's World Cup, hosting all matches of Group A and D, plus semi-finals, third place and final. Estadio Charrúa also hosted all the matches of 2022 South American U-17 Women's Championship.

Rugby 
After the agreement signed in 2012, Estadio Charrúa became the frecquent venue of the Uruguay national team, having hosted several World Cup qualification and test matches. The stadium has also been Peñarol's home venue for their games at the Super Rugby Americas since its first edition in 2020.

Concerts 
Some artists that performed at Estadio Charrúa were Andrés Calamaro, Daddy Yankee, Joan Manuel Serrat and Joaquín Sabina, Marc Anthony, No Te Va Gustar, La Vela Puerca, Ricardo Arjona, Selena Gomez & the Scene, and Silvio Rodríguez.

Gallery

See also
 List of rugby league stadiums by capacity
 List of rugby union stadiums by capacity

References

External links

 
 Estadio Charrúa at URU

Football venues in Montevideo
Rugby union stadiums in Uruguay
Multi-purpose stadiums in Uruguay